Amy Voce is an English broadcaster, formerly of Gem 106 and currently broadcasting on Virgin Radio UK and its sister station Virgin Radio Chilled.

Voce is best known for her on-air work with Sam Pinkham, presenting the Sam and Amy breakfast show on Gem 106 (formerly Heart East Midlands) for eleven years. The programme won two Gold Radio Academy Awards (2013 & 2014), Gold at the 2015 Arqiva Commercial Radio Awards and Silver at the 2016 ARIAS. The duo have also presented cover shows for BBC Radio 2 and Magic.

Originally from Leicester, Voce attended Beauchamp College and Nottingham Trent University, began her radio career as a traffic reporter, before progressing to drivetime and weekend breakfast shows for Heart East Midlands (now Gem) and in 2006, the flagship weekday breakfast show.

On television, Voce has presented specials for Chilled TV and Now Music TV. From August 2015 to September 2017, the 'Sam and Amy' show for Gem 106 was simulcast live on local television channel Notts TV. Away from broadcasting, Voce is also an events host and has written for publications including Reveal Magazine and Sound Women UK. She also co-presents a podcast, Two Non Blondes, alongside Hits Radio Network presenter Jennie Longdon.

On 29 September 2017, Voce and Pinkham left Gem 106 to join national DAB station Virgin Radio UK to present its weekday breakfast show between Monday 2 October 2017 and 18 January 2019. She currently presents late night and weekend breakfast shows on the station and shows on its sister station Virgin Radio Chilled.

References

External links
 Official website

Living people
English radio presenters
British radio personalities
People from Leicester
Virgin Radio (UK)
1982 births